Person of Interest: Season 3 & 4 is the third soundtrack of the American television series Person of Interest, composed by Ramin Djawadi, bringing together music used for the third and fourth season. Released in January 2016, the album includes twenty-four music composed specially for seasons 3 and 4 of Person of Interest.

The album contains only the creations of Ramin Djawadi, thus, all other music or songs used in the series are not present.

Track listing
All music by Ramin Djawadi.

Credits and personnel
Personnel adapted from the album liner notes.

 J. J. Abrams - Executive Soundtrack Producer
 Tony Blondal - Orchestration
 Bryan Burk - Executive Soundtrack Producer
 Brandon Campbell - Arranger
 Stephen Coleman - Conductor, Orchestration
 Ramin Djawadi - Composer, Conductor, Primary Artist, Producer
 Milton Gutierrez - Assistant Engineer
 Hollywood Studio Symphony - Orchestra
 Steve Kaplan - Scoring Engineer
 William Marriott - Technical Score Advisor

 Kathy Matthews - Coordination
 Jonathan Nolan - Executive Soundtrack Producer
 Greg Plageman - Executive Soundtrack Producer
 Peter Rotter - Orchestra Contractor
 Bronwyn Savasta - Executive in Charge of Music
 Patricia Sullivan - Mastering
 Robert Townson - Executive Producer
 Tom Trafalski - Music Editor
 Booker White - Music Preparation

References 

Album
2016 soundtrack albums
Ramin Djawadi soundtracks
Television soundtracks
Varèse Sarabande soundtracks